Welton le Marsh (or Welton in the Marsh) is a village and civil parish in the East Lindsey district of Lincolnshire, England.

The name 'Welton le Marsh' derives from the Old English Wella-tun meaning 'farm/settlement with a spring/stream'. Marsh was added to distinguish from the other villages named Welton in Lincolnshire.

The parish church is dedicated to Saint Martin, and was originally medieval, but rebuilt in 1792 of stone and brick, and restored in 1891. It is a Grade II* listed building.

A Neolithic flint axe and perforated stone hammer head were found here in 1948 and 1906. A Bronze Age flanged axe was found just outside moated area at Hanby Hall Farm.

Thwaite Hall is a Grade II listed building, reputedly part of a former Augustinian Priory, with attached cottage; the present house dates from the 14th century. The Lincs to the Past website describes it as the site of an Augustinian Cell belonging to Thornton Abbey which was recorded in 1440 and which still existed in 1536.

Welton le Marsh has a local public house, The Wheel Inn.

Also within the parish is Candlesby Hill Quarry, a nature reserve which was once Gunby estate chalk pit. It is a Site of Special Scientific Interest (SSSI) maintained by the Lincolnshire Wildlife Trust.

References

External links

Villages in Lincolnshire
Civil parishes in Lincolnshire
East Lindsey District
Sites of Special Scientific Interest in Lincolnshire